Assen (abbreviation: Asn) is a railway station located in Assen, Netherlands. The station was opened on 1 May 1870 and is located on the Meppel–Groningen railway. The station is operated by Nederlandse Spoorwegen. A new station building was opened in 2020, featuring a large wooden triangular roof with windows allowing light down to the indoor spaces and platforms, replacing the previous building from 1988. From 1902 until 1947 there was also a railway line to Gasselternijveen, where trains connected to the railway line to Stadskanaal.

Future

The railway station and station area, is to be upgraded along with other public works around the city of Assen, such as the creation of a harbour quarter, joining up the canal system through the city and creation of a city boulevard. The road that passes outside the station will become an underground section. While above ground it will become pedestrianised towards the city centre and the new harbour quarter.

The upgraded station will accommodate an underground bicycle storage area, and cycle shop replacing the current outside stalls for rail users.
The contract to re-design Assen station was won by the Powerhouse Company and De Zwarte Hond.

FlorijnAs is overseeing the wider works of improvement in the city and their website, available in Dutch and English, explains that: "Towards the end of 2015 the relocation of the cables and pipes for the station begins. Then the implementation of the road tunnel is planned for 2016, and In mid-2016 ProRail is to start work with the tracks and the platform tunnel." However 27 August 2015 saw the website spoorPRO release an article, stating that the works on the tracks have been pushed back till 2017, due to "hard work being scheduled elsewhere on other projects in 2016", while further in the article ProRail and contractors are stated to have said they are "currently working on the biggest track renewal since the birth of the railways".

While there is expected to be disruption from these works for everyday users, the station is currently not due to close during the scheduled works.

There are plans to open a station south of this one, called Assen Zuid, which will serve southern Assen as well as the TT Circuit Assen.

Train services

Bus services

See also
 List of railway stations in Drenthe

References

External links
  Station Assen, train schedules and station facilities
 

Buildings and structures in Assen
Railway stations in Drenthe
Railway stations opened in 1870
Railway stations on the Staatslijn C